The All-in-Wonder (also abbreviated to AIW) was a combination graphics card/TV tuner card designed by ATI Technologies. It was introduced on November 11, 1996. ATI had previously used the Wonder trademark on other graphics cards (ATI Wonder series), however, they were not full TV/graphics combo cards (EGA Wonder, VGA Wonder, Graphics Wonder). ATI also made other TV oriented cards that use the word Wonder (TV Wonder, HDTV Wonder, DV Wonder), and remote control (Remote Wonder). The All-in-Wonder line debuted with the Rage chipset series. The cards were available in two forms, built by third-party manufacturers (marked as "Powered by ATI") as well as by ATI itself ("Built by ATI").

Each of the All-in-Wonder Radeon cards is based on a Radeon chipset with extra features incorporated onto the board. AIW cards run at lower clock speeds (two exceptions are the AIW 9600XT/AIW X800XT faster/same speed) than their conventional counterparts to reduce heat and power consumption. In June 2008, AMD revived the product line with an HD model.

Accessories

The cards use a variety of specialised ports along the side to provide output to televisions, with the retail version equipped with composite ports and the ability to output to component. Later products also comes with a Remote Wonder remote control and a USB RF receiver to receive radio frequency signals from the remote. Some variants of the All-in-Wonder included FM radio tuning as well. Some analog tuners were bundled with Gemstar's Guide Plus+ electronic program guide for TV listings, while digital tuners used TitanTV instead.

Drivers

The AIW card drivers are based on ATI's Catalyst drivers with additional T200 unified stream drivers. Currently, the only operating systems fully supporting TV capture with these cards are Microsoft Windows XP, 2000, 98, and 95. Display drivers work on Linux, and TV capture is supported on some cards with the GATOS project.

Lineup

See also
 ATI Wonder series
 Comparison of ATI Graphics Processing Units
 List of AMD graphics processing units

References

External links

ATI Multimedia Products page
TechPowerUp Database of GPUs
General ATI TV and Overlay Software (GATOS) - open-source Linux suite for All-in-Wonder cards

Computer-related introductions in 1996
Graphics cards
ATI Technologies products
Products introduced in 1996